Darracott is an unincorporated community in Monroe County, Mississippi.

According to the United States Geological Survey, variant names are Darracott Crossroads, Fousts Shop, and Southern Crossroads.

References

Unincorporated communities in Monroe County, Mississippi
Unincorporated communities in Mississippi